Jim Kusler was the former Secretary of State of North Dakota from 1989 to 1992. He farms near Beulah, North Dakota.

Kusler was also co-host of the radio show "Friday Night Live", which airs Friday nights on KDKT-AM radio in West-Central North Dakota. Kusler was also the owner of Brush Creek Organic Foods LLC, an organic farm that sells products to health food stores nationally.

Kusler was the only Democrat to ever serve as North Dakota's secretary of state. He died on November 7, 2021

External links
North Dakota Secretary of State
KDKT SportsRadio 1410

Notes

Living people
Secretaries of State of North Dakota
People from Mercer County, North Dakota
North Dakota Democrats
Year of birth missing (living people)